Awakening is the third studio album by American metalcore band Blessthefall. It was released on October 4, 2011, through Fearless Records. It is the band's second album with singer Beau Bokan and first album with rhythm guitarist Elliott Gruenberg after the departure of Mike Frisby. The album was produced by Michael "Elvis" Baskette, producer of the second album, Witness. On September 12, the song "40 Days..." was released on the IGN site. It debuted at No. 32 on the Billboard 200, selling over 11,290 copies in its first week. In Canada, the album debuted at No. 88 on the Canadian Albums Chart. Like Witness, the album features a few songs without harsh screaming or death growls.

Critical reception

Revolver magazine briefly reviewed the album, though pointing out the "same-sounding guitar and drum patterns and dynamic shifts that showcase the group’s tight, precision playing but scream for variety."

Track listing

Personnel
Blessthefall
 Beau Bokan – clean vocals
 Eric Lambert – lead guitar, backing clean vocals
 Elliott Gruenberg – rhythm guitar
 Jared Warth – bass guitar, unclean vocals
 Matt Traynor – drums, percussion

Production
 Michael "Elvis" Baskette – production
 Chris Dudley (of Underoath) – programming
 Jeff Gross – artwork

Charts

References

2011 albums
Blessthefall albums
Fearless Records albums
Albums produced by Michael Baskette